

Pre-season

NAB Cup

Practice Match

AFL Premiership Season

AFL Finals Series

Essendon Football Club seasons
Essendon Football Club Season, 2009
Essendon Football Club Season, 2009